Sir Edward Thomason (c. 1769 – 29 May 1849) was a manufacturer and inventor in Birmingham knighted by King William IV.

Life

He was born around 1769 in Birmingham. His father Edward Thomason (1740 – 1793) was a manufacturer of buckles, and his mother was Mary Garlick.

He married Phillis Brown Glover, daughter of Samuel Glover of Abercarn, Monmouth, on 26 August 1799. His son, Henry Botfield Thomason, died on 12 July 1843 aged 41. Edward Thomason's grandson, and Henry Botfield's son, Henry Richard Yeoville Yardley Thomason became an architect in Birmingham, designing many of the city's landmark buildings.

At age 16 he was articled to Matthew Boulton in the Soho Foundry. He began manufacturing in his father's factory around 1793, establishing a trade in gilt and plated buttons. The business expanded into manufacture of medals, tokens and coins, and later plated gold and silver works. In 1835 he sold the business to Whitegrave and Collis.

In 1823 he cast a 2½ ton bronze statue of George IV (the first bronze statue cast in Birmingham), but he failed to sell it, and it was eventually sold for scrap.

In 1839 he improved the gun lock by making the cock detachable by the thumb and finger as well as making improvements to prevent misfires.

In 1844 he retired from business and moved to Ludlow, then Bath, then Warwick.

In 1845 he published his memoirs in which he illustrated his manufactured products and inventions.

He died in his house in Jury Street, Warwick in 1849, and a memorial was erected to him in St Philip's Cathedral, Birmingham.

Appointments
In 1818 he was elected to the office of High Bailiff of Birmingham. He was also Vice-consul for the town of Birmingham for the governments of Russia, France, Prussia, Austria, Spain, Portugal, Brazil, Sweden and Norway.

Awards
1823 Gold Medal of Merit from The King of Prussia 
1830 Cross and decoration of the order of Francis I of Merit from the King of Naples 
1831 Order of the Lion for civil merit from the King of the Netherlands
1831 Order of the Red Eagle of Prussia, fourth class
1832 Knighthood from King William IV
1833 Cross of the order of Isabel the Catholic
1833 Order of the Lion and Sun from Persia
1833 Constantian order of St George from Ferdinand II, King of Naples
1834 Order of St Maurice and Lazarus from the King of Sardinia
1835 Cross of the Order of Christ from the King of Portugal
1838 Royal Guelphic order from the King of Hanover

References

1760s births
1849 deaths
People from Birmingham, West Midlands
English silversmiths
English inventors
Knights Bachelor
Knights of the Order of the Netherlands Lion
Recipients of the Order of Isabella the Catholic
Recipients of the Order of Saints Maurice and Lazarus
Recipients of the Order of Christ (Portugal)